Liu Haixia (born 23 October 1980) is a former Chinese weightlifter, and world champion competing in the −63 kg and −69 kg division.

Career
At the 2007 World Weightlifting Championships she won the gold medal in the 63 kg division while also setting a new senior world record in the total with 257 kg.

Major results

References

1980 births
Living people
Chinese female weightlifters
World Weightlifting Championships medalists
Asian Games medalists in weightlifting
Weightlifters at the 2006 Asian Games
Asian Games gold medalists for China
Medalists at the 2006 Asian Games
20th-century Chinese women
21st-century Chinese women